Fredericus Joannes Louer (24 November 1931 – 29 November 2021) known as Frits Louer, was a Dutch footballer who played as a forward for NOAD and Willem II. He played in three matches and scored once for the Netherlands national team between 1952 and 1954. He represented his country at the men's tournament of the 1952 Summer Olympics.

References

External links
 

1931 births
2021 deaths
Dutch footballers
Association football forwards
Netherlands international footballers
Olympic footballers of the Netherlands
Footballers at the 1952 Summer Olympics
Footballers from Tilburg
Willem II (football club) players